Zavrh pri Galiciji is a settlement in the Municipality of Žalec in east-central Slovenia. It lies in the Hudinja Hills northeast of Žalec. The area is included in the Savinja Statistical Region and is part of the traditional region of Styria.

Name
The name of the settlement was changed from Zavrh to Zavrh pri Galiciji in 1953.

References

External links
Zavrh pri Galiciji at Geopedia

Populated places in the Municipality of Žalec